Electric Heavyland is an album by Acid Mothers Temple & The Melting Paraiso U.F.O., released in 2002 by Alien8 Recordings.

Track listing

Credits

Credits, as stated on the Acid Mothers website:

 Cotton Casino - vocals, synthesizer, beer & cigarette
 Tsuyama Atsushi - monster bass, cosmic joker
 Higashi Hiroshi - synthesizers, dancin' king
 Koizumi Hajime - drums, sleeping monk
 Kawabata Makoto - guitars, speed guru

References

2002 albums
Acid Mothers Temple albums
Alien8 Recordings albums